Marie-Jo Lafontaine (born 17 November 1950) is a Belgian sculptor and video artist. She lives and works as a Professor of Media Arts at the Karlsruhe University of Arts and Design in Brussels.

She studied from 1975 to 1979 at l'École nationale supérieure d'architecture et des arts visuels.

She has worked in many media including "tapestries" in which she weaves black-dyed wool into linear patterns; sculptural work using plaster, concrete, and lead; and photography. In 1980, Lafontaine started using video in her sculptures and has created installations and environments utilizing video.

She was awarded the Prix de la Jeune Peinture Belge in 1977; a FIACRE grant from the French Ministry of Culture in 1986, and in 1996 the European Photography Award.

Critic Konstanze Thümmel describes the dominating themes in her post-1980s video work as "association between Eros and Thanatos, passion and reason," and that Lafontaine explores these "...through powerful images of people and animals in extreme situations."

Lafontaine is best known for her work Les larmes d'acier (1986).

References

External links

Entry for Marie-Jo Lafontaine on the Union List of Artist Names

1945 births
Living people
20th-century Belgian women artists
21st-century Belgian women artists
Belgian video artists
Belgian women sculptors
Artists from Antwerp
Belgian contemporary artists